The Louetsi is a river of southwestern Gabon, flowing through Ngounié Province. It flows through Bongolo and the Bongolo Dam on the river provides hydroelectric power to the lower third of Gabon. In 1993, a bridge financed by the US, Canada and France was announced costing CFA69.280m for construction over the Louetsi near Lébamba. The total cost of the scheme was estimated at CFA281.745m.

References

External links
Photograph

Rivers of Gabon
Ngounié Province